Kazimierz Maranda (born 23 February 1947) is a Polish middle-distance runner.  He ran in the men's 3000 metres steeplechase at the 1972 Summer Olympics.

References

1947 births
Living people
Athletes (track and field) at the 1972 Summer Olympics
Polish male middle-distance runners
Polish male steeplechase runners
Olympic athletes of Poland
Place of birth missing (living people)
Universiade bronze medalists for Poland
Universiade medalists in athletics (track and field)
Medalists at the 1975 Summer Universiade